Mon paradis is the first studio album recorded by Christophe Maé. It was released in 2007 and sold over two million copies worldwide, and topped the chart about ten months after its release. The album remained on the SNEP Chart for two years (133 weeks, 70 of them in the top ten) and on the Ultratop 40 Chart (81 weeks). The first single, "On s'attache", went to number one in France.

Track listings 
 CD

 "On s'attache" (Dandrimont, Florence, Mae) – 3:11
 "Mon paradis" (Domisseck, Mae) – 3:10
 "Belle demoiselle" (Domisseck) – 3:30
 "Parce qu'on sait jamais" (Florence, Jacquot) – 3:12
 "Ça fait mal" (Dandrimont, Mae) – 3:42
 "L'art et la manière" (Florence, Obispo) – 4:05
 "C'est ma terre" (Florence, Mae, Oricelli) – 3:50
 "Maman" (Mae, Oricelli) – 3:46
 "Ma vie est une larme" (Dandrimont, Mae) – 3:17
 "Va voir ailleurs" (Dandrimont, Mae) – 3:14
 "Mon père spirituel" (Mae) – 3:19
 "Spleen" (Mae, Pilot, Rodriguez) – 2:59

 Collector edition
+ DVD

Personnel and credits 
 Guitar: Jean-Marc Benais, Bruno Dandrimont
 Percussion: Denis Benarrosch and Sydney Thiam
 Drums: Michaël Desir
 Keyboards: Johan Dalgaard & Frederic Gaillardet
 Guitar, harmonica, vocals: Christophe Maé
 Bass: Laurent Vernerey
 Musical direction: Dominique Gau
 Mastering: Rodolphe Plisson
 Programming, engineered and mixed by Volodia
 Design: André Palais
 Photo retouching, booklet: Bernard Benant

Release history

Charts and sales

Weekly charts

Year-end charts

Certifications

References 

2007 debut albums
Christophe Maé albums